Julius Adams Stratton (May 18, 1901 – June 22, 1994) was a U.S. electrical engineer and university administrator. He attended the University of Washington for one year, where he was admitted to the Zeta Psi fraternity, then transferred to the Massachusetts Institute of Technology (MIT), from which he graduated with a bachelor's degree in 1923 and a master's degree in electrical engineering (EE) in 1926. He then followed graduate studies in Europe and the Technische Hochschule of Zürich (ETH Zurich), Switzerland, awarded him the degree of Doctor of Science in 1927.

Professional biography 

He published the classic book "Electromagnetic Theory" as part of the McGraw-Hill series in Pure and Applied Physics in 1941. It has been re-issued by the IEEE. He was elected to the American Academy of Arts and Sciences in 1946.

Stratton was elected to the United States National Academy of Sciences in 1950 and the American Philosophical Society in 1956. He served as the president of MIT between 1959 and 1966, after serving the university in several lesser posts, notably appointments to provost in 1949, vice president in 1951, and chancellor in 1956.

In the 1955–1965 he served as member of Board of Trustees, RAND Corporation. He also served as the chairman of the Ford Foundation between 1964 and 1971.

In 1967, Stratton was seconded to chair a Congressionally established "Commission on Marine Sciences, Engineering and Resources" whose work culminated in a report, "Our Nation and the Sea", published in 1969, that had a major influence on ocean sciences and management in the United States and abroad. The commission itself became commonly referred to as the Stratton Commission.

Stratton was also a founding member of the National Academy of Engineering.

Stratton collected his speeches in a 1966 book titled Science and the Educated Man: Selected Speeches of Julius A. Stratton (Cambridge, Mass.: MIT Press, 1966), with a foreword by the historian of technology Elting E. Morison who had been on the faculty of MIT as a professor of humanities in the Sloan School of Industrial Management from 1946 to 1966.

MIT's Julius Adams Stratton Student Center at 84 Massachusetts Avenue is named in his honor.

Selected publications

Articles

Books
  (1st edition 1941)

References

Sources

External links 
 IEEE History Center- IEEE minibio of Julius Stratton
 Full text of the final Stratton Commission report, "Our Nation and the Sea"
 

 

1901 births
1994 deaths
Massachusetts Institute of Technology School of Science faculty
Presidents of the Massachusetts Institute of Technology
20th-century American engineers
Fellows of the American Physical Society
Founding members of the United States National Academy of Engineering
Members of the United States National Academy of Engineering
Members of the United States National Academy of Sciences
IEEE Medal of Honor recipients
Massachusetts Institute of Technology provosts
MIT School of Engineering alumni
MIT Sloan School of Management faculty
People from Seattle
20th-century American academics
Members of the American Philosophical Society